Barbatti is a surname. Notable people with the surname include:

Bruno Barbatti (1926–2020), Swiss scholar and writer
Mario Barbatti (born 1971), Brazilian physicist, chemist, and writer